Ahmadou Sekou Tall (June 21, 1836 – December 15, 1897) (also Ahmadu Sekou, Ahmad al-Madani al-Kabir at-Tijani) was a Toucouleur ruler (Laamdo Dioulbé) of the Toucouleur Empire (1864–92) and (Faama) of Ségou (now Mali) from 1864 to 1884. Ahmadu Sekou's father, El Hadj Umar Tall, conquered Ségou (then the heart of the Bambara Empire) on March 10, 1861. Not long afterwards, he began his conquest of the Fula empire of Massina, leaving Ahmadu as the Almami of Ségou. After the advance of the French in 1887, he abandoned Ségou and accepted a French protectorate called the Treaty of Gouri on 12 May 1887.

After Umar Tall died in 1864, his nephew Tidiani Tall succeeded him as head of the Toucouleur Empire. Ahmadu Sekou continued to act as Faama of the eastern regions from Ségou, suppressing the rebellions of several neighboring cities but quarrelling increasingly with his brothers. The French colonial army invaded the empire in the 1880s and 1890s, taking Ségou in 1892 and forcing Ahmadu Sekou to flee to Sokoto (now in present-day Nigeria).

References

English references
B. O. Oloruntimeehin. The Segu Tukulor Empire. New York: Humanities Press (1972). SBN 391002066

Toucouleur Empire
Malian imams
1836 births
1897 deaths
People from Ségou